Second Nature is a short film about skateboarding created for Sector 9 Skateboards.

Plot summary
In an exploration of the abstract and the extreme, Second Nature is an examination of the natural boundaries of the human body. Noah Sakamoto, Patrick Rizzo and J.M. Duran star as the test subjects as they wield skateboards and blue suits to race down the roads of the High Sierras in California.

Awards and honors
Second Nature has won several awards including "Best Extreme Sports Film" at the Mammoth Film Festival, "Best Short Film" at the X-Dance Action Sports Film Festival, and "Best Sports Film" at the Sonoma International Film Festival and Best Adventure Sport Film at the 5 Point Film Festival.

References

2009 short documentary films
2009 films
American sports documentary films
2000s sports films
American short documentary films
2000s English-language films
2000s American films